This is a list of school divisions in Saskatchewan.

There are currently twenty-seven school divisions:  eighteen public divisions, eight Roman Catholic Separate School Divisions, and one fransaskois school division.

When Saskatchewan was created in 1905, there were over five thousand school districts in Saskatchewan operating one room school houses.  In the 1940s, the provincial government instituted an amalgamation process resulting in larger school units, which greatly reduced the number of school divisions.  In 2004, the government announced a further amalgamation process. Seventy-one school divisions  were amalgamated into twelve new school divisions and two re-structured school divisions, while thirteen other school divisions were not affected.

Notes

References

External links
School Divisions map from Government of Saskatchewan
Active List of Saskatchewan Schools/Programs Provincial K-12 Headcount Enrolment (as of September 30, 2018).

Education in Saskatchewan
 
School divisions
Saskatchewan school districts